Willie Phillips (born ) was an American professional basketball player. He played for the Chicago Bruins in the National Basketball League during the 1939–40 season and averaged 1.8 points per game. He played college basketball and football at DePaul University in the 1930s.

References

1910s births

Year of birth uncertain
Year of death missing
American men's basketball players
Basketball coaches from Indiana
Basketball players from Indiana
Chicago Bruins players
DePaul Blue Demons football players
DePaul Blue Demons men's basketball players
Forwards (basketball)
Guards (basketball)
High school basketball coaches in Indiana
High school football coaches in Indiana
Sportspeople from Hammond, Indiana